The 1964 NCAA University Division Golf Championship was the 26th annual NCAA-sanctioned golf tournament to determine the individual and team national champions of men's collegiate golf in the United States.

The tournament was held at the Broadmoor Golf Club at The Broadmoor resort in Colorado Springs, Colorado.

Houston won the team title, the Cougars' seventh NCAA team national title.

After 1964, the NCAA would switch the tournament format from match play to stroke play. The NCAA would also stop awarding a tournament medalist.

Individual results

Individual champion
 Terry Small, San José State

Tournament medalist
 Jerry Potter, Miami (FL) (139)

Team results

Note: Top 10 only
DC = Defending champions

References

NCAA Men's Golf Championship
Golf in Colorado
NCAA Golf Championship
NCAA Golf Championship
NCAA Golf Championship